Seanon Williams (born 10 February 1991) is a Barbadian tennis player.

Williams represents Barbados at the Davis Cup, where he has a W/L record of 3–13.

References

External links

1991 births
Living people
Barbadian male tennis players
Sportspeople from Bridgetown
Tennis players at the 2015 Pan American Games
Tennis players at the 2019 Pan American Games
Pan American Games competitors for Barbados